Snowblood were a four-piece (sometimes five-piece) experimental sludge/post rock/doom metal band from Glasgow, Scotland, formed in 2002. Their third and final self-titled album was released in 2009, through Superfi Records.

Snowblood composed lengthy guitar-based pieces, usually focused around the elaboration of a single theme. These pieces developed the dynamics between the serene and the brutal side of the post rock and doom metal genres. 

Their first two albums, The Human Tragedy (2004) and Being and Becoming (2005) were both recorded by Neil McNaught at the Split Level Studios in Edinburgh, Scotland. Their third album was recorded and produced by the band in a cottage near the Scottish village of Buckie.

Discography

Albums

The Human Tragedy [Superfi (LP) / Lawgiver (CD)] 2004
Being and Becoming [Superfi (LP) / Lawgiver (CD)] 2005
Self Titled [Superfi (CD)] 2009

Compilation albums

"Aubade" appeared on It Came From the Hills (Magic Bullet Records)

References

External links
Official website
Superfi Records Official Website

British doom metal musical groups
Scottish heavy metal musical groups
Scottish post-rock groups